Reginald Scot (or Scott) ( – 9 October 1599) was an Englishman and Member of Parliament, the author of The Discoverie of Witchcraft, which was published in 1584. It was written against the belief in witches, to show that witchcraft did not exist. Part of its content exposes how (apparently miraculous) feats of magic were done, and the book is often deemed the first textbook on conjuring.

Life
He was son of Richard Scot, second son of Sir John Scott (died 1533) of Scots Hall in Smeeth, near Ashford in Kent. His mother was Mary, daughter of George Whetenall, sheriff of Kent in 1527. His father died before 1544, and his mother remarried Fulk Onslow, clerk of the parliament; dying on 8 October 1582, she was buried in the church of Hatfield, Hertfordshire. Reginald or Reynold (as he signed his name in accordance with contemporary practice) was born about 1538.

When about seventeen, Scot entered Hart Hall, Oxford, but left the university without a degree. His writings show some knowledge of law, but he is not known to have joined any inn of court. Marrying in 1568, he seems to have spent the rest of his life in his native county. His time was mainly passed as an active country gentleman, managing property which he inherited from his kinsfolk about Smeeth and Brabourne, or directing the business affairs of his first cousin, Sir Thomas Scot, who proved a generous patron, and in whose house of Scots Hall he often stayed. He was collector of subsidies for the lathe (county subdivision) of Shepway in 1586 and 1587, and he was perhaps the Reginald Scot who acted in 1588 as a captain of untrained foot-soldiers at the county muster. He was returned to the parliament of 1588–89 as member for New Romney, and he was probably a justice of the peace. He describes himself as "esquire" in the title-page of his Discoverie, and is elsewhere designated "armiger".

Scot married at Brabourne, on 11 October 1568, Jane Cobbe of Cobbes Place, in the parish of Aldington. By her he had a daughter Elizabeth, who married Sackville Turnor of Tablehurt, Sussex. Subsequently, Scot married a second wife, a widow named Alice Collyar, who had a daughter called Mary by her former husband.

Scot made his own will (drawing it with his own hand) on 15 September 1599. He died at Smeeth on 9 October following, and was probably buried in the church of St. Mary the Virgin, Brabourne, with his first wife Jane. His small properties about Brabourne, Aldington, and Romney Marsh he left to his widow. The last words of his will run: "Great is the trouble my poor wife hath had with me, and small is the comfort she hath received at my hands, whom if I had not matched withal I had not died worth one groat."

Doctrine and espoused belief
In the Discoverie, Scot aligns himself with Reformed Protestantism, quoting John Calvin more than a dozen times. Calvin in turn was echoing the skepticism toward superstitions of early English reformer John Wycliffe. Scot expresses what is often called the Providential view in stating that "it is neither a witch, nor devil, but glorious God that maketh the thunder...God maketh the blustering tempests and whirlwinds..." This doctrine was also aligned with the tenth-century Canon Episcopi and Scot quotes from it. In the last half of the sixteenth century, an active theological debate continued from various pulpits throughout Europe – Calvinist, Lutheran, and Roman Catholic – between those who supported the skeptical Episcopi/Providential tradition and those who believed that witches could obtain real supernatural powers through an agreement or pact with the devil. The latter belief in the power of witches, and an intense phobia toward them, was associated by Scot with the book Malleus Maleficarum by the German inquisitor Heinrich Kramer, and upon this book Scot focuses the most criticism, and lumps others aligned with the same view of witchcraft: "...from whom [Jean] Bodin and all the other writers... do receive their light..."

A late twentieth-century historian argues that Scot was likely influenced by, and perhaps a member of, the Family of Love. An intriguing clue to this theory is the name Abraham Fleming written backwards (Gnimelf Maharba) in Scot's lengthy bibliography in the front pages of the Discoverie.

Works

About hops cultivation
In 1574 he published his Perfect Platform of a Hop-garden, and necessary instructions for the making and maintenance thereof, with Notes and Rules for Reformation of all Abuses. The work, which is dedicated to Serjeant William Lovelace of Bethersden in Kent, is the first practical treatise on hop culture in England; the processes are illustrated by woodcuts. Scot, according to a statement of the printer, was out of London while the work was going through the press. A second edition appeared in 1576, and a third in 1578.

About witchcraft and magic

His work on witchcraft was The Discoverie of Witchcraft, wherein the Lewde dealing of Witches and Witchmongers is notablie detected, in sixteen books … whereunto is added a Treatise upon the Nature and Substance of Spirits and Devils, 1584. Scot enumerates 212 authors whose works in Latin he had consulted, and twenty-three authors who wrote in English. He studied the superstitions respecting witchcraft in courts of law in country districts, where the prosecution of witches was constant, and in village life, where the belief in witchcraft flourished. He set himself to prove that the belief in witchcraft and magic was rejected alike by reason and religion, and that spiritualistic manifestations were either wilful impostures or illusions due to mental disturbance in the observers. The book also includes several chapters describing conjuring and sleight of hand tricks in detail.

References

Attribution

Further reading
 Brinsley Nicholson, in an introduction to an 1886 printing of Discoverie, thoroughly traces the biography and publication record of Reginald Scot.

Other publications:

 Leland L. Estes Reginald Scot and His "Discoverie of Witchcraft": Religion and Science in the Opposition to the European Witch Craze, Church History, Vol. 52, No. 4 (Dec. 1983), pp. 444–456.
 Philip C. Almond. England's First Demonologist: Reginald Scot and 'The Discoverie of Witchcraft'. (London: 2011)

External links
 
 1584 edition of Discoverie
 1886 edition of Discoverie, with introduction and notes by Brinsley Nicholson
 Excerpts from books I and XV of The Discovery of Witchcraft from history.hanover.edu
 Full text of book XV from the Esoteric Archives
 James I vs Reginald Scot, or the history of an auto-da-fé
 1876 Genealogy of Scott Family by James Renat Scott
 The Discouerie of Witchcraft From the McManus-Young Collection in the Rare Book and Special Collection Division at the Library of Congress
 A Perfite Platforme of a Hoppe Garden From the English Printing Collection in the Rare Book and Special Collection Division at the Library of Congress
 Scot's discovery of witchcraft From the McManus-Young Collection in the Rare Book and Special Collection Division at the Library of Congress
 

1530s births
1599 deaths
English MPs 1589
English non-fiction writers
Witchcraft in England
Demonologists
English sceptics
Historians of magic
16th-century English writers
16th-century male writers
English male non-fiction writers
English agriculturalists
Critics of witch hunting